The 1933 Davidson Wildcats football team was an American football team that represented Davidson College as an independent during the 1933 college football season. In their second year under head coach Williams Newton, the team compiled a 6–2–1 record.

Schedule

References

Davidson Wildcats
Davidson Wildcats football seasons
Davidson Wildcats football